G'zOne is a series of water, shock and dust resistant telephones manufactured by Casio.  So far, the line has included:

Flip phones:

Each of these offers essentially the same feature set with the specifics (camera resolution, ring tone count, etc.) gradually improving on each model.

 Type V
 Type S
 Boulder
 Rock
 Ravine
 Ravine 2

With Keyboard:

 Brigade

Android:

 Commando
 Type L
 201L

Website

G'zone
Verizon Wireless